Hale House is the name of several buildings.

Stephen Fowler Hale House, Eutaw, Alabama
Hale House, Hoover, Alabama, listed on the Alabama Register of Landmarks and Heritage
Hale House (Los Angeles, California)
Nathan Hale Homestead, Coventry, Connecticut, also called the Deacon Richard Hale House
Dr. Elizur Hale House, Glastonbury, Connecticut
Hale-Byrnes House, Stanton, Delaware
Hale House (University of Chicago), Chicago, Illinois
John Hale House, Beverly, Massachusetts
Edward Everett Hale House, Boston, Massachusetts
Rosemont (Woodville, Mississippi), also called the Hale House
William Hale House, Dover, New Hampshire
Dinsmoor–Hale House, Keene, New Hampshire
Hale House, Elizabethtown, New York, part of the Hand–Hale Historic District
Hale House Center, New York, New York, founded by Clara Hale
Elijah Hale Residence, Bath Township, Ohio, listed on the National Register of Historic Places (NRHP)
Jonathan Hale House, Bath Township, Ohio, part of the Hale Farm and Village
Kearns-Hale House, Zanesville, Ohio, listed on the NRHP
Hale House (South Kingstown, Rhode Island)
Hale–Elmore–Seibels House, Columbia, South Carolina
Patterson Hotel (Watertown, Tennessee), also called the Hale House
Stephen G. Bourne House, Fries, Virginia, also called the Bourne-Hale House
Captain Calvin and Pamela Hale House, Olympia, Washington
Dr. James W. Hale House, Princeton, West Virginia
Henry Fiedler House, Orion, Wisconsin, also called the Ellen Hale House, listed on the NRHP

See also
Hale Manor
Hales Mansion
Joseph Haile House